Mtsensky District is an administrative and municipal district (raion), one of the  twenty-four in Oryol Oblast, Russia. It is located in the north of the oblast. Its administrative center is the town of Mtsensk (which is not administratively a part of the district). Population: 19,233 (2010 Census);

Geography 
Within the Oryol Oblast the Mtsensk District borders:

 the Bolkhovsky District (to the north-west)
 the  Orlovsky District (to the south-west)
 the Zalegoshchensky District (to the south)
 the Novosilsky District (to the south-east)
 the  Korsakovsky District (to the east)

The Chernsky District of Tula Oblast lies north of the Mtsensk District.

Administrative and municipal status
Within the framework of administrative divisions, Mtsensky District is one of the twenty-four in the oblast. The town of Mtsensk serves as its administrative center, despite being incorporated separately as a town of oblast significance—an administrative unit with the status equal to that of the districts.

As a municipal division, the district is incorporated as Mtsensky Municipal District. The town of oblast significance of Mtsensk is incorporated separately from the district as Mtsensk Urban Okrug.

References

Notes

Sources



Districts of Oryol Oblast